Jean-Pierre [François] Blanchard (4 July 1753 – 7 March 1809) was a French inventor, best known as a pioneer of gas balloon flight, who distinguished himself in the conquest of the air in a balloon, in particular the first crossing of the English Channel, on 7 January 1785.

Biography

1784 - Flights in Paris
Blanchard made his first successful balloon flight in Paris on 2 March 1784, in a hydrogen gas balloon launched from the Champ de Mars. The first successful manned balloon flight had taken place on 21 November 1783, when Pilâtre de Rozier and the Marquis d'Arlandes took off at Palace of Versailles in a free-flying hot air balloon constructed by the Montgolfier brothers. The first manned hydrogen balloon flight had taken place on 1 December 1783, when Professor Jacques Charles and Nicolas-Louis Robert launched La Charlière from the Jardin des Tuileries in Paris. Blanchard's flight nearly ended in disaster, when one spectator (Dupont de Chambon, a contemporary of Napoleon at the École militaire de Brienne) slashed at the balloon's mooring ropes and oars with his sword after being refused a place on board. Blanchard intended to "row" northeast to La Villette but the balloon was pushed by the wind across the Seine to Billancourt and back again, landing in the rue de Sèvres. Blanchard adopted the Latin tag Sic itur ad astra as his motto.

The early balloon flights triggered a phase of public "balloonomania", with all manner of objects decorated with images of balloons or styled au ballon, from ceramics to fans and hats. Clothing au ballon was produced with exaggerated puffed sleeves and rounded skirts, or with printed images of balloons. Hair was coiffed à la montgolfier, au globe volant, au demi-ballon, or à la Blanchard.

1784 - Flights in London
Blanchard moved to London in August 1784, where he took part in a flight on 16 October 1784 with John Sheldon, just a few weeks after the first flight in Britain (and the first outside France), when Italian Vincenzo Lunardi flew from Moorfields to Ware on 15 September 1784. Blanchard's propulsion mechanisms – flapping wings and a windmill – again proved ineffective, but the balloon flew some 115 km from Lewis Lochée’s military academy in Little Chelsea, landing in Sunbury and then taking off again to end in Romsey. Blanchard took a second flight on 30 November 1784, taking off with an American, Dr John Jeffries, from the Rhedarium behind Green Street Mayfair, London to Ingress in Kent.

1785 - First flight over the English Channel

A third flight, again with Jeffries, was the first flight over the English Channel, taking about 2½ hours to travel from England to France on 7 January 1785, flying from Dover Castle to Guînes. Blanchard was awarded a substantial pension by Louis XVI. The King ordered the balloon and boat be hung up in the church of Église Notre-Dame de Calais. (A subsequent Channel crossing attempt in the opposite direction by Pilâtre de Rozier on 15 June 1785 ended unsuccessfully in a fatal crash.)

Flights in Europe
Blanchard toured Europe, demonstrating his balloons. He holds the record of first balloon flights in Belgium, Germany, the Netherlands, and Poland. Among the events that included demonstrations of his abilities as a balloonist was the coronation of Holy Roman Emperor Leopold II as King of Bohemia in Prague in September 1791.

Following the invention of the modern parachute in 1783 by Sébastien Lenormand in France, in 1785 Jean-Pierre Blanchard demonstrated it as a means of jumping safely from a balloon. While Blanchard's first parachute demonstrations were conducted with a dog as the passenger, he later had the opportunity to try it himself when in 1793 his hydrogen balloon ruptured and he used a parachute to escape. Subsequent development of the parachute focused on making it more compact. While the early parachutes were made of linen stretched over a wooden frame, in the late 1790s, Blanchard began making parachutes from folded silk, taking advantage of silk's strength and light weight.

1793 - Flights in America
On 9 January 1793, Blanchard conducted the first balloon flight in the Americas. He launched his balloon from the prison yard of Walnut Street Jail in Philadelphia, Pennsylvania and landed in Deptford, Gloucester County, New Jersey. One of the flight's witnesses that day was President George Washington, and the future presidents John Adams, Thomas Jefferson, James Madison, and James Monroe were also present. Blanchard left the United States in 1797.

Personal life and death
He married Marie Madeleine-Sophie Armant (better known as Sophie Blanchard) in 1804. On 20 February 1808 Blanchard had a heart attack while in his balloon at The Hague. He fell from the balloon and died roughly a year later on 7 March 1809 due to severe injuries. His widow continued to support herself with ballooning demonstrations until doing so also killed her.

Pictures

See also
 List of firsts in aviation
 Timeline of hydrogen technologies

Notes

References

References

External links

Journal of Jean-Pierre Blanchard's forty-fifth ascension, being the first performed in America, on January 9, 1793 (1918)
 Further information with images about Blanchard's life and flight across the Channel

1753 births
1809 deaths
People from Les Andelys
French balloonists
Aviation pioneers
18th-century French inventors
Balloon flight record holders
French aviation record holders
Accidental deaths from falls
Accidental deaths in the Netherlands